The Battle of Oriskany ( or  ) was a significant engagement of the Saratoga campaign of the  American Revolutionary War, and one of the bloodiest battles in the conflict between the Americans and Great Britain. On August 6, 1777, a party of Loyalists and several hundred Indian allies from different tribes ambushed an American military party that was marching to relieve the siege of Fort Stanwix. This was one of the few battles in which the majority of the participants were Americans; Patriots and allied Oneidas fought against Loyalists and allied Iroquois in the absence of British regular soldiers. There was also a detachment of Hessians in the British force, as well as Western Indians including members of the Mississaugas.

The Patriot relief force came up the Mohawk Valley under the command of General Nicholas Herkimer and numbered about 800 men of the Tryon County militia, plus a party of approximately 60 Oneida warriors. British commander Barry St. Leger authorized an intercepting force consisting of a Creuzbourg's Jäger Corps detachment, Sir John Johnson's King's Royal Regiment of New York, Indian allies from the Six Nations, particularly Mohawks and Senecas and other tribes to the north and west, and Loyalist Rangers, totaling at least 450 men.

The Loyalist and Indians force ambushed Herkimer's force in a small valley about six miles (10 km) east of Fort Stanwix, near the Oneida village of Oriskany, New York. Herkimer was mortally wounded, and the battle cost the Patriots approximately 451 casualties, while the Loyalists and Indians lost approximately 150 dead and wounded. The result of the battle remains ambiguous. The apparent Loyalist victory was significantly affected by a sortie from Fort Stanwix in which the Loyalist camps were sacked, damaging morale among the allied Indians.

The battle also marked the beginning of a war among the Iroquois, as Oneida warriors under Joseph Louis Cook and Han Yerry allied with the American cause. Most of the other Iroquois tribes allied with the British, especially the Mohawks and Senecas. Each tribe was highly decentralized, and there were internal divisions among bands of the Oneida, some of whom also migrated to Canada as allies of the British. The site is known in Iroquois oral histories as "A Place of Great Sadness." The site has been designated a National Historic Landmark; it is marked by a battle monument at the Oriskany Battlefield State Historic Site.

Background 

In June 1777, the British Army launched a two-pronged attack from Quebec under the command of General John Burgoyne. Burgoyne's objective was to split New England from the other colonies by gaining control of New York's Hudson Valley. The main thrust came south across Lake Champlain under Burgoyne's command; the second thrust was led by Lt. Colonel Barry St. Leger and was intended to come down the Mohawk Valley and meet Burgoyne's army near Albany.

St. Leger's expedition consisted of about 1,800 men who were a mix of British regulars, Creuzbourg's Jäger Corps, Loyalists, Rangers, and Indians of several tribes, including the Mohawks and Senecas of the Iroquois. They traveled up the Saint Lawrence River and along the shore of Lake Ontario to the Oswego River, which they ascended to reach the Oneida Carry in Rome, New York. They began to besiege Fort Stanwix, a Continental Army post guarding the portage.

Prelude
Tryon County's Committee of Safety head Nicholas Herkimer was warned of a possible British attack along the Mohawk River, and he issued a proclamation on July 17 warning of possible military activity and urging the people to respond if needed. Oneida allies warned him on July 30 that the British were just four days from Fort Stanwix, and he put out a call-to-arms. The force raised totaled 800 from the Tryon County militia composed primarily of poorly trained farmers who were chiefly of Palatine German descent. They set out on August 4 and camped near the Oneida village of Oriska on August 5. A number of the militia dropped out of the column due to their lack of conditioning, but Herkimer's forces were augmented by a company of 60 to 100 Oneida warriors led by Han Yerry, a strong supporter of the Patriot cause. That evening, Herkimer sent three men toward the fort with messages for the fort's commander Colonel Peter Gansevoort. Gansevoort was to signal the receipt of the message with three cannon shots and then sortie to meet the approaching column. The couriers, however, had difficulty getting through British lines, and they did not deliver the message until late the next morning, after the battle was already underway.

St. Leger learned on August 5 that Herkimer and his relief expedition were on their way from a messenger that Molly Brant had sent to her brother Joseph Brant, the Mohawk leader who led a portion of St. Leger's "Indian" contingent. St. Leger sent a detachment of light infantry from Sir John Johnson's Royal Yorkers toward the position that evening to monitor Herkimer's position, and Brant followed early the next morning with about 400 Indians and Loyalist Rangers. Many of the Indians were armed with muskets, while others carried only tomahawks and spears.

Battle
Herkimer held a war council on the morning of August 6. He wanted to wait because he had not heard the expected signal from the fort, but his captains pressed him to continue, accusing him of being a Tory because his brother was serving under St. Leger. He was stung by the accusations and relented, ordering the column to march on toward Stanwix.

About six miles (9.6 km) from the fort, the road dipped more than 50 feet (15 m) into a marshy ravine with a stream at the bottom that was about three feet wide. Seneca chiefs Sayenqueraghta and Cornplanter chose this place to set up an ambush; the King's Royal Yorkers waited behind a nearby rise and the Indians concealed themselves on both sides of the ravine. The plan was for the Yorkers to stop the head of the column, after which the Indians would attack the extended column. At about 10 am, Herkimer's column descended into the ravine, crossed the stream, and began ascending the other side with Herkimer on horseback near the front.

Contrary to the plan, the Indians lying in wait opened fire on the rear of the column, taking the Patriots completely by surprise. Colonel Ebenezer Cox was leading the 1st Regiment (Canajoharie district), and he was shot off his horse and killed in the first volley. Herkimer turned his horse to see the action and was struck by a ball that shattered his leg and killed the horse. Several of his officers carried him to a beech tree and urged him to retire from further danger. He defiantly replied, "I will face the enemy", and calmly sat leaning against the tree smoking a pipe and giving directions and words of encouragement to the men nearby.

The trap had been sprung too early, and portions of the column had not yet entered the ravine. Most of these men panicked and fled; some of the attacking Indians pursued them, resulting in a string of dead and wounded that extended for several miles. Between the loss of the column rear and those killed or wounded in the initial volleys, only about one half of Herkimer's men were still fighting 30 minutes into the battle. Some of the attackers who were not armed with muskets waited for the flash of an opponent's musket fire before rushing to attack with the tomahawk. Mohawk warrior Louis Atayataronghta was fighting with Herkimer's men, and he shot one of the enemies whose fire had been devastatingly accurate, noting that "every time he rises up he kills one of our men".

Herkimer's men eventually rallied, fighting their way out of the ravine to the crest to its west. John Johnson was concerned about the militia's tenacity, so he returned to the British camp and requested some reinforcements from St. Leger, returning with 70 men. A thunderstorm caused a one-hour break in the fighting, during which Herkimer regrouped his militia on the higher ground. He instructed his men to fight in pairs; while one man fired and reloaded, the other waited and then only fired if attacked. They were to keep at least one weapon loaded at all times to reduce the effectiveness of the tomahawk attacks.

Ranger John Butler took time during the thunderstorm to question some of the captives, and thus learned about the three-cannon signal. Johnson and his reinforcements arrived, and Butler convinced them to turn their coats inside out to disguise themselves as a relief party coming from the fort. When the fighting restarted, Johnson and the rest of his Royal Yorkers joined the battle, but Patriot Captain Jacob Gardinier recognized the face of a Loyalist neighbor. Close combat continued for some time, often hand-to-hand between men who were neighbors.

Sortie from Fort Stanwix
Herkimer's messengers reached the fort at around 11 a.m., and Colonel Gansevoort organized the requested sortie. Lieutenant Colonel Marinus Willett led 250 men from the fort and raided the nearly deserted enemy camps to the south, driving away the few British and Indians left in them (including women) and taking four prisoners along the way. They collected blankets and other personal possessions from the Indian camps, and they also raided John Johnson's camp, taking his letters and other writings.

One of the Indians guarding the camps ran to the battlefield to alert fellow warriors that their camps were being raided. They disengaged with cries of "Oonah, oonah!", the Seneca signal to retire, and headed for the camps to protect their women and possessions. This forced the smaller number of German and Loyalist combatants to also withdraw.

Aftermath

Patriots
Herkimer was seriously wounded and many of his captains were killed, and the battered remnant retreated to Fort Dayton. His men carried him from the battlefield and his leg was amputated, but the operation went poorly and he died on August 16. The Indians retrieved most of their dead by the following day, but many dead and wounded Patriots were left on the field. Benedict Arnold's relief column marched through several weeks later, and the men were moved by the stench and grisly scene.

General Philip Schuyler learned of the retreat from Oriskany and immediately organized additional relief to be sent to the area. Arnold's relief column arrived at Fort Stanwix on August 21, and he sent messengers into the British camp who convinced the British and Indian besiegers that his force was much larger than it actually was. They abandoned their siege and withdrew.

Loyalists
Butler was promoted to the rank of Lieutenant Colonel for his role in the battle, and he was authorized to raise a regiment that became known as Butler's Rangers. After the siege was lifted, some Loyalists returned to Quebec while others joined Burgoyne's campaign on the Hudson, including numerous warriors from various tribes.

Indians
Brant and Seneca chief Sayenqueraghta proposed the next day to continue the fighting by pursuing the Patriots downriver toward German Flatts, New York, but St. Leger turned them down. This battle marked the beginning of a war among the tribes in the Iroquois Confederacy, as it was the first time that they had fought against one other. The Mohawks, Senecas, Cayugas, and Onondagas were allied with the British, as were some Oneidas, and the Iroquois in St. Leger's camp met in council and decided to send the Patriot-allied Oneidas a bloody hatchet. Brant's Mohawks raided and burned the Oneida settlement of Oriska later in the siege. In retaliation, the Oneidas plundered the Mohawk strongholds of Tiononderoge and Canajoharie. They later raided the Fort Hunter Mohawks, prompting most of the remaining Mohawks in central New York to flee to Quebec.

Brant's Indians were said to have tortured and even eaten some of their prisoners. but some modern historians debate this.

Assessment
The battle was one of the bloodiest of the war, based on the percentage of casualties suffered. About half of Herkimer's force were killed or wounded, as were about 15-percent of the British force. St. Leger claimed the battle as a victory, as he had stopped the American relief column, but the Americans maintained control of the battlefield after the withdrawal of the opposing Indians.

The British success was tempered by the discontentment of the Indians after the battle. When they joined the expedition, they expected that the British forces would do most of the fighting, but they were the dominant fighters in this action, and some suffered the loss of their personal belongings taken during the American sortie from the fort. This blow to their morale contributed to the eventual failure of St. Leger's expedition.

Legacy

In an interview many years afterwards, Governor Blacksnake recalled how he "thought at that time the Blood Shed a Stream running down on the  ground."

A monument was erected in 1884 to commemorate the battle at 43° 10.6′N 75° 22.2′W, and much of the battlefield is now preserved in the Oriskany Battlefield State Historic Site. The site was recognized as a National Historic Landmark in 1962, and added to the National Register of Historic Places in 1966. The town of Herkimer, New York and Herkimer County, New York were named in Herkimer's honor. The battle was honored by the name of aircraft carrier , launched in 1945, now an artificial reef, and also by the issuance of a postage stamp in 1977.

See also 
American Revolutionary War § British northern strategy fails. Places 'Battle of Oriskany' in overall sequence and strategic context.
Adam Helmer, one of Herkimer's messengers
Sampson Sammons, a Colonel
USS ''Oriskany

Footnotes

References

Further reading

External links 

The King's Royal Regiment of New York
The Battle of Oriskany: "Blood Shed a Stream Running Down", a National Park Service Teaching with Historic Places (TwHP) lesson plan

1777 in New York (state)
Oriskany
Oriskany
Oriskany
Oriskany
Conflicts in 1777
Oneida County, New York
Oriskany[